Robert P. Ericksen is a historian of the Holocaust.  His book Theologians Under Hitler (1985) was widely acclaimed, and was made into a documentary in 2004.  He maintains affiliations with the Humboldt Foundation and the United States Holocaust Memorial Museum, and sits on the editorial board of Kirchliche Zeitgeschichte, a German journal.  He is currently professor of history at Pacific Lutheran University.

References 

Historians of the Holocaust
Pacific Lutheran University faculty
Living people
Year of birth missing (living people)